Drifters are a Swedish dansband from Skövde that was formed in 1962 and has won many prizes. They are signed to the Lionheart International record label.

Members
In its long existence spanning several decades there were a number of key changes.
Lead singers
1962–1989: Johnny Wendelnäs
1989–1989: Ann-Charlotte Berndtsson
1989–1996: Marie Arturén
1996–1999: Ann-Charlotte Andersson (married and changed surname to Strandell in 2003)
1999–: Erica Sjöström
Bass
1968–2004: Leif Svensson
2004–2009: Kent Liljefjäll 
2009– Henrik "Turbo" Wallrin 
Keyboards
1969–1980: Lennart Green
1983– Stellan Hedevik
Drums
1983–2005: Robert Muhrer
2005–2011: Mattias Berghorn
2011– Tim Nilsson

In popular culture
They also sang the theme for TV series Möbelhandlarens entitled "När du var här" in 2006.

Awards and nominations
In 2004, the band was voted at Svenska dansbandsveckan i Malung in 2004 as best dansband with 50% of the popular vote, and awarded the Guldklaven against competition from Lasse Stefanz with 35% and Black Jack with 15% of the votes.
In 2007, they were nominated for a Swedish Grammy for "Best Dance/Pop".

Discography

Albums

Singles

References

External links
 Drifters

Dansbands
Musical groups established in 1962
1962 establishments in Sweden